Adrian Tucker (born 19 September 1969) is an Australian former cricketer. He played 17 first-class matches for New South Wales. He was also part of Australia's squad for the 1988 Youth Cricket World Cup.

References

External links
 

1969 births
Living people
Australian cricketers
New South Wales cricketers
Cricketers from Sydney